Neblinichthys echinasus is a species of catfish in the family Loricariidae. It is native to South America, where it occurs in the Mazaruni River drainage in Guyana. The species reaches 8.3 cm (3.3 inches) SL.

References 

Ancistrini
Fish described in 2010